The Liberal Progressive Party (PPL) was a Spanish political party of centre-right, founded in 1976 and directed by Juan García de Madariaga and Jaime Santafé Mira.

On 18 April 1977 the party decided to contest in the Spanish general election under the Union of the Democratic Centre coalition, however on September 30 of that year it separated from that group. Subsequently, on December 15, 1977 it became part of the Liberal Federation along with the Independent Liberal Party, the Liberal Party, the Galician Democratic Party, and the People's Party of Catalonia.

In April 1978 it merged with other liberal parties in the Liberal Citizens Action, headed by José María de Areilza.

References

Liberal parties in Spain
Political parties established in 1976
Political parties disestablished in 1978
1976 establishments in Spain
1978 disestablishments in Spain